Famous Five is a 2012 German children's film.

Plot (based on the chapters of the DVD)

It's a typical Blyton Story. The Four children and their dog hunting rogues. In the end, the criminals are arrested.

Chapter 1 The start

Julian, Dick and Anne get off a bus at a lonely street near by the sea. Anne mentions, that someone should have picked them up, but the Kirrins don't have a car. Julian puts Anne in mind of not calling Georgina "Georgina" but "George". A woman in a car arrives and introduces herself as Mrs. Miller, the neighbour of the Kirrins, and she takes the children to their destination.
Whilst that George is hitting a punching bag, when her mother tells her to be friendly to their upcoming guests. George is not happy of having them stay with them and tells her mother that she doesn't need any friends.
When the three siblings arrive together with Mrs. Miller, Uncle Quentin is packing, because he plans to stay the next days on Kirrin Island ("Felseninsel") where he wants to concentrate on his research work. At the welcome scene Anne calls her cousin accidentally "Georgina" but corrects herself immediately. Around a corner of the house a man is secretly taking pictures of Uncle Quentin.

Chapter 2 Here you live

George loathly shows the three the house and their room. Dick tries to get a view into Uncle Quentin's lab, but George slams the door right in front of him. Being asked what her father's research is about she says, that she could tell them, but then had to kill them right after. Anne says, that in this case they didn't want to know. George spends the evening alone by the sea where she meets Timmy.
The next morning the children are served some porridge-like stuff for breakfast, which they don't really like. George is persuaded by her mother to do a cycling tour with the three and she wants to take them to the "Teufelsfelsen" (Devil's Rock). Julian and George are having a cycling contest, which Julian almost wins but is tricked by George. He tells her, that it's no wonder that she's having no friends. George leaves them alone and cycles to the harbour to say Goodbye to her father, who promises to send her a blip every evening so she will know he's OK. Meeting Mrs. Miller it becomes obvious, that she hides Timmy, who isn't allowed to stay in the Kirrins' house. Again Uncle Quentin is secretly photographed by a man.
Julian, Dick and Anne try to find the Teufelsfelsen on their own. They meet a couple next to the sea, who don't know the way either.

Chapter 3 Saving Timmy

Finally they find the Teufelsfelsen and enter a cave regardless of a sign saying "stay out, dangerous", because they hear the barking of a dog from inside. Julian almost falls into a hole, where they spot Timmy the Dog at the bottom of it. With their jackets and a rope they let down Julian in the hole and pull up Timmy. Then Dick and Anne try to pull up Julian, but are unable to hold the rope. They nearly drop him the second time when George comes up and together they pull Julian out of the hole. George realises that the three saved Timmy and she thanks them.

Chapter 4 The voice in the cave

Together they examine the cave and find a radio transmitter with a voice distortion device. They listen and answer to a voice saying "It's about time we took care of the professor. Let's hope he co-operates." and after finding a map of Kirrin Island George figures out, that there is somebody after her father. They run to call the police. Dick writes down the frequency of the radio on a piece of paper he found next to it.
At the local police station they finally convince PC Peters, who is already quite comfortable on this Friday afternoon, to come with them to the cave. Back to the cave his assistant PC Hansen has already blocked the area with much barrier tape "police line, do not cross". Both policemen don't seem to be very smart.
Inside the cave the radio is gone and there is no evidence left that there ever was one. The children are taken back to Aunt Fanny and get a fine for illegally entering the cave. George is blamed by her mother, but the others tell her that they did this together.

Chapter 5 Blip

George is upset and tries to convince her mother that Uncle Quentin might be in danger. Then they see the blip from Kirrin Island, telling them that everything is OK. On that evening the four of them are together in George's room and she tells them about the secret work of Uncle Quentin: He is developing a technique to produce electricity with plants. He seems to be quite save on Kirrin Island, for the island is surrounded by dangerous rocks, where only he knows the way through them. George never was on Kirrin Island. The friends decide to unmask the unknown persons (called the "alphas") threatening Uncle Quentin.
The next morning they sneak out of the house and want to go to the cave looking for clues. We learn that Timmy is banned from the Kirrins´ house, because he accidentally destroyed parts of Uncle Quentin's work and now lives with Mrs. Miller. On the way to the cave Anne notices a man, who installs a video camera in the dunes to spy on Kirrin Island. It is the man, who formerly took pictures of Uncle Quentin. They follow the man to a hotel, where he has rented a room.

Chapter 6 False alarm

The friends try to figure out how to get into the room of the suspect and examine it. They cause a false fire alarm getting everybody out of the hotel and then enter the room. They find a lot of information that this man has about Uncle Quentin. Shortly after that the false alarm is ended and now time is running short, because the man is coming back to his room. Even Timmy doesn't succeed to detract him and the friends have to escape through the bathroom window and jump from the roof into a laundry container, not without taking pictures of the evidence they have spottet.

Chapter 7 Chase

The man chases them through the village and along the beach on a bike. They finally hide at the couple that Julian, Dick and Anne have met on their first way to the cave near the beach. This couple tells them that they are bird watchers looking for a puffin.
After that George takes the others to their secret place, an abandoned shipwreck, that she has equipped all on her own.
Suddenly the man who has hunted them appears. He introduces himself as Peter Turner, an agent from a European secret service. After passing several tests the Five trust him, believing that he only wants to help Uncle Quentin.

Chapter 8 With the secret agent

We learn that the secret service does not know who is after Uncle Quentin and his work, but Uncle Quentin refuses to receive help from the secret service. The children are told to keep their eyes open but not to interfere. The agent then examines the cave on his own.
The friends are recapitulating the information that have by now. Dick shows the piece of paper he picked up in the cave and George finds out, that there is an imprint of a signature on it and she makes it readable. They call agent Turner, who tries to answer the call, but is being knocked out by an unknown person at that very moment. The friends are unaware of that and conclude to find out the author of that signature by their own, because that must be one of the villains.
It is Dick's plan to get a signature from all the inhabitants of the village and compare it with the signature on the paper.

Chapter 9 Police check

Anne is collecting people's signatures for a faked campaign "save the seals" and is getting controlled by the two policemen. As she doesn't have an approval for her information desk, she tells the policemen that they are collecting signatures to convict the people who are after Uncle Quentin. By the way she learns from the policemen that the bird watchers want to visit Kirrin Island. With that information and not having found any matching signatures by now the friends now concentrate on the bird watchers and find out, that they have a hovercraft, which could bring them to Kirrin Island in spite of the dangerous rocks. The bird watchers act quite suspicious and they also have a pocketbook with them, that the children have formerly seen in the cave.

Chapter 10 The lab on the island

On the island Uncle Quentin is working on his invention, almost forgetting to send the blip to George. By now the friends are sure, that the bird watchers are the villains. They plan to sabotage the hovercraft to prevent them to get to Kirrin Island. While George and Anne are distracting the bird watchers Julian and Dick get on the hovercraft.

Chapter 11 on the hovercraft

Accidentally Julian and Dick start the hovercraft and speed through the harbour bay unable to get it under control. They finally crash into some pile of junk on the mole destroying the hovercraft and the equipment on it. They want the police to arrest the pretending bird watchers and try to prove that they are fake. But it emerges that they are real bird watchers and not the villains.

Chapter 12 The children are in danger

Aunt Fanny is horrified when she hears from the policemen what the children have done. The friends are helpless and confused, because everything seemed so obvious. Julian gets a call from his father who wants them to come home immediately. George wants them to stay and help her. Julian accuses her, that it was her idea to sabotage the hovercraft, what got them into that big trouble, and George runs out of the room seeming to end the friendship with Julian, Dick and Anne.
Back in her shipwreck she takes the fine order, which she got for illegally entering the cave, out of her pocket. She takes a look at the signature and learns that it matches to the so far unidentified signature on the piece of paper Dick found in the cave. As PC Hansen has signed the fine order it is now clear, that he must be one of the villains. George follows him.

Chapter 13 Back home

The next morning the three siblings sadly start their journey back home with Mrs. Miller bringing them to the bus station in her car.
Whilst that PC Hansen enters the cave with George and Timmy breathing down to his neck. She follows him into a tunnel that leads under the sea and directly to Kirrin Island. George reaches the island and her father's lab and finds him captured by PC Peters, who has a bomb with him.

Chapter 14 The end of the coffee party

Then PC Hansen captures George and Uncle Quentin promises to give his invention to Peters and Hansen, when they promise not to hurt George. George is arrested in a cell under the lab and Timmy runs away. We learn that Agent Turner is also jailed by Peters and Hansen and that the two policemen have set the friends on a wrong track so that they suspected the bird watchers.
Whilst that Julian, Dick and Anne enter the bus bringing them home. Timmy runs through the tunnel back to the onshore and after the bus. The three finally see him, stop the bus and realise that George is in danger. They follow Timmy through the tunnel and back on the island.

Chapter 15 Timmy comes to aid

In the lab Uncle Quentin has finished his work. Peters and Hansen force him to copy all the data from his computer on their portable hard disk. Timmy and the three others arrive at George's prison cell and the friends are reunited. PC Hansen wants to arrest Timmy as well but is overwhelmed by the Five. They try to rescue Agent Turner but fail.

Chapter 16 Copy process finished

In the lab PC Peters has got the information he wanted on his hard disk and destroys Uncle Quentin's Computer, so now he's the only one who has the invention, but the Five trap him with Anne finally knocking him out. They put him in the cell together with Hansen. The Five then try to rescue Uncle Quentin who is tethered to his chair.
Whilst that Peters and Hansen manage to escape from their prison cell, but can be held captured under a trap door with the Five all together sitting on top of it.

Chapter 17 Dangerous Mrs. Miller

Suddenly Mrs. Miller appears on the island and we learn, that she is the head of the villains. She activates the bomb to detonate in 5 minutes and brings the Five back to the prison cell. When she wants Hansen and Peters to get in the cell as well, because she isn't willing to share profit with them, the villains are again overwhelmed by the Five and captured in the cell.
There's not more than 2 Minutes remaining to deactivate the bomb. With the help of Agent Turner they figure out, that the red wire has to be cut through. Just before Dick is doing so Turner mentions, that it also might be the black wire – if there is one.

Chapter 18 The black wire

In the literally last second Dick finds the black wire and cuts it through saving all of them from being blown up. Uncle Quentin for the first time calls Georgina "George" what he hasn't done before. Timmy brings back the portable hard disk with Uncle Quentin's work on it and is allowed to stay in the house from now on. The villains are brought to prison by Agent Turner.
Back at the Kirrins' house Agent Turner praises the Five and thanks them for their help. He promises that the secret service will compensate the bird watchers for the destroyed hovercraft and the equipment. The Five promise to show them a way to the island so they can watch the puffins. Finally Agent Turner asks the children how he should call them in his report and they tell him, that they are the "Fünf Freunde".

Chapter 19 End credits

Background

Most parts of the movie were filmed in Schleswig, Germany, in summer 2011. Marcus Harris, the actor of Julian in the 1970s TV series The Famous Five, plays a concierge. Its premiere was on 26 January 2012 in Munich and a second in Schleswig, few days later. The film was invited to the 2012 TIFF Kids International Film Festival in Toronto.

References

External links 

 
 Fünf Freunde Filmportal.de
 

2010s German-language films
2012 films
2010s German films
German children's films
Films based on children's books
Films based on British novels
Adaptations of works by Enid Blyton